This is the discography of South African-Swiss DJ Nora En Pure.

Compilation albums

Extended plays

Singles

Charted singles

Singles

Remixes
2013
Calippo — "Spend Time Well" (Nora En Pure Remix)

2014
Adrian Lux feat. Kaelyn Behr — "Sooner Or Later" (Nora En Pure Remix)
Klingande — "Jubel" (Nora En Pure Remix)
Croatia Squad and Calippo — "The Conductor" (Nora En Pure Remix)
Dirty Vegas — "Setting Sun" (Nora En Pure Remix)

2015
Me & My Toothbrush — "One Thing" (Nora En Pure Remix)
Paul Harris feat. Dragonette — "One Night Lover" (Nora En Pure Remix)

2016
Rüfüs Du Sol — "You Were Right" (Nora En Pure Remix)
Kyle Watson — "Sink Deep" (Nora En Pure Club Remix)

2017
Alok and Bruno Martini featuring Zeeba — "Hear Me Now" (EDX & Nora En Pure Remix)
Milk & Sugar — "Music Is Moving" (Nora En Pure Remix)
Blvk Jvck featuring Dyo — "Mind Games" (Nora En Pure Remix)

2018
Why Don't We — "8 Letters" (Nora En Pure Remix)

2019
Nora En Pure featuring Ashibah — "We Found Love" (Nora En Pure and Passenger 10 Remix)
Sofi Tukker — "Fantasy" (Nora En Pure Remix)
Eelke Kleijn featuring Ost — "Lost Souls" (Nora En Pure Remix)
Above & Beyond and Seven Lions featuring Opposite The Other — "See the End" (Nora En Pure Remix)

2021
Tove Lo - "Cool Girl" (Nora En Pure Remix)

2022
Claptone featuring Dizzy - "Queen of Ice" (Nora En Pure Remix)
Dom Dolla and Mansionair - "Strangers" (Nora En Pure Remix)

References

Discographies of South African artists
House music discographies